Ebonée Noel (born May 25, 1990) is a Guyanese-American actress. She is known for her role as Special Agent Kristen Chazal in the CBS series, FBI.

Early life
Ebonée Reigne Noel was born May 25, 1990 to Cheryl E. Noel and Patrick Wharton. Her parents are both Guyanese. Noel travelled with her mother who worked in numerous countries for the United Nations. Noel's grandfather was Frank Noel once permanent secretary of the Guyanese Ministry of Trade. Noel went to school in various countries but graduated with a degree in Fine Arts from the New York University Tisch School of the Arts.

Career 
Her television debut was in 2014 on Law & Order: Special Victims Unit. In 2017, she starred in the Shonda Rhimes period drama series, Still Star-Crossed, the show was cancelled after single season. She later appeared in Louis C.K.' comedy-drama film I Love You, Daddy, and had a recurring role in the TBS sitcom Wrecked.

In 2018, Noel was cast in a series regular role of Special Agent Kristen Chazal in the CBS series, FBI. She left the series after two seasons. In 2022, she went to star in the Oprah Winfrey Network prime time soap opera, The Kings of Napa playing ambitious August King.

Filmography

Film

Television

References

External links
 

Living people
1990 births
Guyanese actresses
American actresses
21st-century American women